The mainline Protestant churches (sometimes also known as oldline Protestants) are a group of Protestant denominations in the United States and in some cases Protestant denominations in Canada largely of the theologically liberal or theologically progressive persuasion that contrast in history and practice with the largely theologically conservative Evangelical, Fundamentalist, Charismatic, Confessional, Confessing Movement, historically Black church, and Global South Protestant denominations and congregations. Some make a distinction between "mainline" and "oldline", with the former referring only to denominational ties and the latter referring to church lineage, prestige and influence. However, this distinction has largely been lost to history and the terms are now nearly synonymous.

Mainline Protestant churches have stressed social justice and personal salvation, and both politically and theologically, tend to be more liberal than non-mainline Protestants. Mainline Protestant churches share a common approach that often leads to collaboration in organizations such as the National Council of Churches, and because of their involvement with the ecumenical movement, they are sometimes given the alternative label of "ecumenical Protestantism" (especially outside the United States). While in 1970 the mainline Protestant churches claimed most Protestants and more than 30 percent of the American population as members,  they are a minority among American Protestants, claiming approximately 15 percent of American adults. Some have criticized the term mainline for its alleged White Anglo-Saxon Protestant ethnocentric and elitist assumptions, and its erroneous association with the term "mainstream," since the term mainline almost exclusively described White, non-fundamentalist and non-evangelical Protestant Americans from its origin to the late twentieth century.

History 
Mainline Protestants were a majority of Protestants in the United States until the mid-20th century. A dip in membership across all Christian denominations was more pronounced among mainline groups, with the result that mainline groups no longer comprise the majority. In 2020, Public Religion Research Institute conducted a religious census, based on self-identification, finding that an estimated 16% of U.S. Americans identified as non-Hispanic white mainline Protestants, slightly outnumbering non-Hispanic white evangelical Protestants who were 14% of the US American population. In 2014, Pew Research completed and published the Religious Landscape Survey in which it was estimated that 14.7% of US Americans identified as mainline Protestant, excluding historically Black and African American denominations, while 25.4% identified as evangelical Protestants, also excluding membership in historically Black denominations.

The largest mainline churches in the United States, often referred to as the "Seven Sisters of American Protestantism", are as follows:

American Baptist Churches
Christian Church (Disciples of Christ)
The Episcopal Church
Evangelical Lutheran Church in America
Presbyterian Church (USA)
United Church of Christ
United Methodist Church.
The term 'mainline' has also been applied to Canadian Protestant churches that share common origins with their US counterparts  such as the:
 United Church of Canada
 Anglican Church of Canada
 Presbyterian Church in Canada
 Evangelical Lutheran Church in Canada.

Smaller denominations also widely considered mainline include, but are not limited to, the:

 Reformed Church in America
 The Mennonite Church - Mennonite Church USA and Mennonite Church Canada
 Church of the Brethren 
 Moravian Church in North America 
 Many Religious Society of Friends (Quakers) group.

In Mexico, the Anglican Church is historically tied to and formed from the US Episcopal Church. The term is also occasionally used to refer to historic Protestant churches in Europe, Latin America, and South Africa.

Mainline churches share an active approach to social issues that often leads to cooperation in organizations such as the National Council of Churches. Because of their involvement with the ecumenical movement, mainline churches are sometimes (especially outside the United States) given the alternative label of ecumenical Protestantism. These churches played a leading role in the Social Gospel movement and were active in social causes such as the civil rights movement and the women's movement. As a group, the mainline churches have maintained religious doctrine that stresses social justice and personal salvation. Members of mainline denominations have played leadership roles in politics, business, science, the arts, and education. They were involved in the founding of leading institutes of higher education. Marsden argues that in the 1950s, "Mainline Protestant leaders were part of the liberal-moderate cultural mainstream, and their leading spokespersons were respected participants in the national conversation."

Some mainline Protestant denominations have the highest proportion of graduate and post-graduate degrees of any other denomination in the United States. Some also include the highest proportion of those with some college education, such as the Episcopal Church (76%), the Presbyterian Church (U.S.A.) (64%), and the United Church of Christ (46%), as well as the most of the American upper class. compared with the nationwide average of 50%. Episcopalians and Presbyterians also tend to be considerably wealthier and better educated than most other religious groups, and they were disproportionately represented in the upper reaches of US business and law until the 1950s.

In the 1990s four of the US Supreme Court Justices were Mainline Protestants: Sandra Day O'Connor, John Paul Stevens, William Rehnquist and David Souter.

From 1854 until at least 1964, Mainline Protestants and their descendants were heavily Republican. In recent decades, Republicans slightly outnumber Democrats.

From 1965 to 1988, mainline church membership declined from 31 million to 25 million, then fell to 21 million in 2005. While in 1970 the mainline churches claimed most Protestants and more than 30 percent of the population as members, today they are a minority among Protestants; in 2009, only 15 percent of Americans were adherents. A Pew Forum statistic revealed the same share in 2014.

Terminology
The term mainline Protestant was coined during debates between modernists and fundamentalists in the 1920s. Several sources claim that the term is derived from the Philadelphia Main Line, a group of affluent suburbs of Philadelphia; most residents belonged to mainline denominations. Today, most mainline Protestants remain rooted in the Northeastern and Midwestern United States. C. Kirk Hadaway and Penny Long Marler define the term as follows: "the term 'mainline Protestant' is used along with 'mainstream Protestant' and 'oldline Protestant' to categorize denominations that are affiliated with the National Council of Churches and have deep historical roots in and long-standing influence on American society."

In the US, Protestantism is generally divided between mainline denominations and evangelical or theologically conservative denominations. In other parts of the world, the term mainline Protestant is not used. Instead, the term "ecumenical" is used to distinguish similar churches from evangelical denominations. Some have criticized the term mainline for its alleged White Anglo-Saxon Protestant ethnocentric and elitist assumptions, and its erroneous association with the term "mainstream" since it almost exclusively described White American, non-fundamentalist and non-evangelical Protestant Americans from its origin to the late twentieth century.

Mainline vs. mainstream
The term mainstream Christian in academic usage is not equivalent to mainline Protestant and is often used as an attempt to find impartial sociological vocabulary in distinguishing orthodoxy and heresy. Hence in Christological and doctrinal reference mainstream Christianity is often equivalent to Trinitarianism. Mainline Protestantism should not be confused with Nicene Christianity which is more widely accepted as having the “mainstream Christianity” designation that also includes non-Mainline Protestants such as Evangelical, Fundamentalist, Charismatic, Confessional, Confessing Movement, historically Black church, and Global South Protestants. In the United Kingdom and Australia, the term mainline Protestant is not used, and mainstream does not mean progressive Protestant. Although some supporters and adherents, do claim that Mainline Protestant is synonymous with Mainstream Protestant.

Denominations

The largest mainline churches are sometimes referred to as the "Seven Sisters of American Protestantism": the United Methodist Church (UMC), Evangelical Lutheran Church in America (ELCA), Episcopal Church (TEC), Presbyterian Church (USA) (PCUSA), American Baptist Churches USA (ABCUSA), United Church of Christ (UCC), and Christian Church (Disciples of Christ). The term was apparently coined by William Hutchison.
 United Methodist Church is the largest mainline Protestant denomination among the "Seven Sisters" with 6.3 million members in the United States in 2020.
 Evangelical Lutheran Church in America (ELCA) is the second largest mainline denomination with approximately 3.1 million members and 8,900 congregations at the end of 2020.
 Episcopal Church is third largest, with 1.7 million active baptized members, of whom 1.6 million members are located in the United States in 2020.
 Presbyterian Church (USA) is the fourth largest mainline denomination, with 1.2 million active members in 8,900 congregations (2020).
 American Baptist Churches USA is fifth in size, with approximately 1.1 million members (2017).
 United Church of Christ is the sixth and has about 770,000 members in 2020.
 Christian Church (Disciples of Christ) is the seventh and has about 351,000 members as of 2020.

The Association of Religion Data Archives, Pew Research, and other sources also consider these denominations, listed with adherents and members, to be mainline:
 Cooperative Baptist Fellowship 700,000 members
 United Church of Canada 388,363 members (2018), 2 million adherents according to 2011 Canadian Census
 Anglican Church of Canada 359,030 members (2017), 1.6 million adherents according to 2011 Canadian Census
 Religious Society of Friends (Quakers) 350,000 members
 Reformed Church in America 194,064 members (2019)
 Evangelical Lutheran Church in Canada 111,570 members (2015)
 Anglican Church of Mexico 100,000 members
 Mennonite Church USA 100,000 members
 Church of the Brethren 98,680 members (2019)
 Presbyterian Church in Canada 79,961 members (2019)
 International Council of Community Churches 69,276 members (2009)
 National Association of Congregational Christian Churches 65,392 members (2002)*
 Alliance of Baptists 65,000 members
 Moravian Church in North America 60,000 members
 Mennonite Church Canada 31,000 members
 Universal Fellowship of Metropolitan Community Churches 15,666 members (2006)
 Latvian Evangelical Lutheran Church in America 12,000 members (2007)
 Estonian Evangelical Lutheran Church Abroad 8,000 members
 Hungarian Reformed Church in America 6,080 members
 Christian Church (Disciples of Christ) in Canada 2,606 members
 Congregational Christian Churches, (not part of any national CCC body)

Historically African American denominations are usually categorized differently from evangelicals or mainline. However, in 2014 the Christian Century identified a group that "fit the mainline description."
 African Methodist Episcopal Church 2.5 million
 African Methodist Episcopal Zion Church 1.4 million
 Christian Methodist Episcopal Church 858,670 members

While no longer exclusively Christian, the Unitarian Universalist Association, with 211,000 adherents, considers itself to be mainline.

Some denominations with similar names and historical ties to mainline groups are not considered mainline. The Southern Baptist Convention (SBC), Lutheran Church–Missouri Synod (LCMS), the Christian and Missionary Alliance (C&MA), the Churches of Christ and Christian churches, the Presbyterian Church in America (PCA), the North American Lutheran Church (NALC), and the Anglican Church in North America (ACNA) are often considered too theologically conservative for this category and thus grouped as evangelical.

*The National Association of Congregational Christian Churches is considered to be evangelical by Pew Research while the Association of Religion Data Archives considered it to be mainline.

Theology

Variation

Mainline Protestantism is characterized by theological and ideological pluralism. While doctrinal standards and confessional statements exist, these are not usually interpreted in ways to exclude people from membership. Richard Hutcheson, Jr., chairman of the Office of Review and Evaluation of the Presbyterian Church in the United States, observed that clergy candidates were more likely to be rejected due to "excessive narrowness" than for violating confessional standards.

Mainline churches hold a range of theological orientations—conservative, moderate and liberal. About half of mainline Protestants describe themselves as liberal. Mainline Christian groups are often more accepting of other beliefs and faiths, affirm the ordination of women, and have become increasingly affirming of gay ordination. Nearly one-third of mainline Protestants call themselves conservative, and most local mainline congregations have a strong, active conservative element. Mainline denominations are historically Trinitarian and proclaim Jesus Christ as Lord and Son of God.

In practice, mainline churches tend to be theologically moderate and influenced by higher criticism, an approach used by scholars to separate the Bible's earliest historical elements from perceived later additions and intentional distortions. Mainline denominations generally teach that the Bible is God's Word in function, but that it must be interpreted both through the lens of the cultures in which it was originally written, and examined using God-given reason. A 2008 survey conducted by the Pew Research Center found that only 22 percent of the 7,500 mainline Christians surveyed said the Bible is God's Word and is to be interpreted as literally true, word for word. Thirty-eight percent thought that the Bible is God's Word but is not to be taken literally, word for word. Twenty-eight percent said the Bible was not the Word of God but was of human origin.

It has been noted, even by members of mainline churches, that the leadership of denominational agencies and bureaucracies has often been more theologically and socially liberal than the overall membership of the mainline churches. This gap has caused feelings of alienation among conservative mainline Protestants. This dissatisfaction has led to the formation of various Confessing Movements or charismatic renewal movements which are more conservative in tone.

Social justice
The mainline denominations emphasize the biblical concept of justice, stressing the need for Christians to work for social justice, which usually involve politically liberal approaches to social and economic problems. Early in the 20th century, they actively supported the Social Gospel.

Mainline churches were basically pacifistic before 1940, but under the influence of people such as Reinhold Niebuhr they supported World War II and the Cold War. They have been far from uniform in their reaction to issues of gender and sexuality, though they tend to be more accepting than the Catholic Church or the more conservative Protestant churches.

Social issues

Many mainline denominations are active in voicing perspectives on social issues. Almost all mainline denominations are gender-inclusive and ordain women. On abortion issues, the Episcopal Church (TEC), Presbyterian Church (USA) (PCUSA), Unitarian Universalist Association (UUA), and United Church of Christ (UCC) are members of the Religious Coalition for Reproductive Choice. The United Methodist Church (UMC) and Evangelical Lutheran Church in America (ELCA) support exceptions, when abortion may be necessary, but do not endorse the procedure. Other denominations, such as the Church of the Brethren and Mennonite Church USA,  are against abortion.

Regarding human sexuality, TEC, the ELCA, PC(USA), Society of Friends (Quaker), UUA, and UCC recognize same-gender marriages. Also considered mainline, the Anglican Church of Canada, Evangelical Lutheran Church in Canada, and United Church of Canada bless or marry same-gender couples. In 2015, the Mennonite Church Canada saw its first same-gender marriage in one of its congregations. The American Baptist Churches USA does not perform same-gender marriages, but allows each congregation the freedom to decide for itself. Including the aforementioned denominations, the Mennonite Church USA, Metropolitan Community Church, and Moravian Church Northern Province license or ordain openly gay clergy. While the UMC does not nationally ordain gay or lesbian clergy, the New York Annual Conference, a regional body of the UMC, has ordained the denomination's first openly gay and lesbian clergy. The Western Jurisdiction of the UMC also elected the denomination's first openly gay bishop. Some congregations of the Church of the Brethren have also voted to perform same-gender marriages although the national denomination opposes this practice.

Most of the above denominations also ordain openly transgender clergy.  While the national church has not approved of gay or lesbian clergy, the UMC has allowed transgender pastors.

Politically, mainline churches are also active. While no particular candidate can be endorsed, mainline churches often invite political speakers. At the 2016 General Conference for the African Methodist Episcopal Church, a historically Black denomination but also identified as mainline, Hillary Clinton was invited to offer an address for the delegates and clergy.

Statistical decline
The term "mainline" once implied a certain numerical majority or dominant presence in mainstream society, but that is no longer the case. Protestant churches as a whole have slowly declined in total membership since the 1960s. As the national population has grown these churches have shrunk from 63% of the population in 1970 to 54% by 2000, and 48% in 2012, ceasing to be the religious category for the majority of Americans. This statistic may be inaccurate due to the number of former or historically mainline Protestants who continue to espouse mainline Protestant values without active church attendance. American affiliation with mainline denominations declined from 55% of all Protestants in 1973 to 46% in 1998. The number of mainline congregations in the U. S. declined from more than 80,000 churches in the 1950s to about 72,000 in 2008.

Various causes of mainline decline in population have been cited. Much analysis has taken place both from those within and outside mainline denominations. Key factors indicate that all types of churches can and do grow, regardless of hymnody or contemporary music, type of liturgy, average age of worshiper, or location On average, however, churches in rural areas, churches with older congregants, and churches with fewer young people involved struggle most to add members and grow churches. For example, of all churches founded since 1993, 54% are experiencing growth, while that is true for only 28% of congregations founded prior to 1900. As demographics change, the churches founded by earlier generations often struggle to adapt to changing conditions, including the declines or shifts in the age and ethnicity of local populations. Says David Roozen, Director of Hartford Seminary's Hartford Institute for Religion Research, "Location, Location, Location used to be the kind way that researchers described the extent to which the growth or decline of American congregations was captive to the demographic changes going on in their immediate neighborhoods." Age demographics cannot be overlooked as a real factor in congregational decline, with the birthrate for mainline Protestants well below what is needed to maintain membership numbers.

The Barna Group, an Evangelical surveyor, has noted, Protestant pastors who serve mainline churches serve on average half as long as Protestant pastors in non-mainline churches. This may contribute to decline and may be influenced in part by the United Methodist Church practice of Itinerancy, where clergy are intentionally moved from one church to another as often as yearly in an effort to support and encourage the United Methodist tradition of strong lay ministry. Mainline churches have also had difficulty attracting minorities, particularly Hispanics. Hispanics comprise 6 percent of the mainline population but 16 percent of the US population. According to the Barna Group report, the failure of mainline Protestants to add substantial numbers of Hispanics is portent for the future, given both the rapid increase of the Hispanic population as well as the outflow of Hispanics from Catholicism to Protestant churches in the past decade, most of whom are selecting evangelical or Pentecostal Protestant churches.

In general, however, decline can be a difficult thing to statistically quantify. Many older Protestant churches lived a vibrant lifetime and continue to evidence vital ministry and faith regardless of declining populations or birthrates. For example, giving and engagement with need and justice, both indicators of strong Christian faith, have increased despite the aging and loss of congregational members.

Contrast with other Protestant denominations
While various Protestant denominations have experienced declining membership, the most pronounced changes have occurred among mainline churches. Demographic trends for evangelical and historically African-American churches have been more stable. According to the Pew Research Center, mainline churches could claim 14.7 percent of all US adults compared to 25.4 percent who belonged to evangelical churches in 2014.

Demographers Hout, Greeley, and Wilde have attributed the long-term decline in mainline membership and the concomitant growth in the conservative Protestant denominations to four basic causes: birth rates; switching to conservative denominations; departure from Protestantism to "no religion" (i.e. secularization); and conversions from non-Protestant sources. In their analysis, by far the main cause is birth rates—low for the mainline bodies, and high for the conservatives. The second most important factor is that fewer conservatives switch to mainline denominations than before. Despite speculation to the contrary, Hout, Greeley, and Wilde argue that switching from a mainline to a conservative denomination is not important in accounting for the trend, because it is fairly constant over the decades. Finally, conservative denominations have had a greater inflow of converts. Their analysis gives no support for the notion that theological or social conservatism or liberalism has much impact on long-term growth trends.

Evidence from the General Social Survey indicates that higher fertility and earlier childbearing among women from conservative denominations explains 76% of the observed trend: conservative denominations have grown their own. Mainline denomination members have the lowest birthrate among American Christian groups. Unless there is a surge of new members, rising death rates are predicted to diminish their ranks even further in the years ahead.

Trends

Some other findings of the Barna Group:
 From 1958 to 2008, mainline church membership dropped by more than one-quarter to roughly 20 million people—15 percent of all American adults.
 From 1998 to 2008, there was a 22 percent drop in the percentage of adults attending mainline congregations who have children under the age of 18 living in their home.
 In 2009, nearly 40 percent of mainline church attendees were single. This increase has been driven higher by a rise in the number of divorced and widowed adherents.
 From 1998 to 2008, volunteerism dropped 21 percent; adult Sunday school participation decreased 17 percent.
 The average age of a mainline pastor in 1998 was 48 and increased to 55 by 2009.
 Pastors on average remain with a congregation for four years compared to twice that length for non-mainline church leaders.

Recent statistics from the Pew Forum provide additional explanations for the decline.
 Evangelical church members are younger than those in mainline denominations. Fourteen percent of evangelical congregations are between 18 and 29 (compared to 2 percent), 36 percent between 30 and 49, 28 percent between 50 and 64, and 23 percent 65 or older.

Not paralleling the decline in membership is the household income of members of mainline denominations. Overall, it is higher than that of evangelicals:
 25% reported less than a $30,000 income per year.
 21% reported $30,000–$49,999 per year.
 18% reported $50,000–$74,999 per year.
 15% reported $75,000–$99,999 per year.
 21% reported an income of $100,000 per year or more, compared to only 13 percent of evangelicals.

History

While the term "mainline" was not applied to churches until the 20th century, mainline churches trace their history to the Protestant Reformation of the 16th century. The largest and most influential Protestant denominations in Britain's Thirteen Colonies were the Anglicans (after the American Revolution called Episcopalians) and the Congregationalists (from which the Unitarians would later split). These were later surpassed in size and influence by the evangelical denominations: the Baptists, Presbyterians and Methodists. Sharing a common Reformation heritage with Episcopal and Congregational churches, these denominations together created the mainline. It was, according to historian Jason Lantzer, "the emerging evangelical movement that would help forge the Seven Sisters and which provides a core to the wide variety of theological and doctrinal differences, shaping them into a more coherent whole."

The Great Awakening ignited controversy within Protestant churches between Old Lights and New Lights (or Old Side and New Side among Presbyterians). Led by figures such as the Congregationalist minister Charles Chauncy, Old Lights opposed the evangelical revivalism at the heart of the Awakening, while New Lights, led by fellow Congregationalist minister Jonathan Edwards, supported the revivals and argued for the importance of having a conversion experience. By the 1800s, Chauncy's followers had drifted toward forms of theological liberalism, such as Universalism, Unitarianism and Transcendentalism.

The Second Great Awakening would inaugurate a period of evangelical dominance within American mainline Protestantism that would last over a century. The Second Great Awakening was a catalyst for the reform of society. Efforts to improve the rights of women, reforming prisons, establishing free public schools, prohibiting alcohol, and (in the North) abolishing slavery were promoted by mainline churches.

After the Civil War, however, tensions between evangelicals and non-evangelicals would re-emerge. As the practice of historical criticism spread to the United States, conflict over biblical inspiration erupted within Protestant churches. Conservative Protestants led by A. A. Hodge, B. B. Warfield and other Princeton theologians argued for biblical inerrancy, while liberal theologians such as Charles A. Briggs of Union Theological Seminary were open to using historical criticism to understand the Bible.

As 19th–century evangelicals embraced dispensational premillennialism and retreated from society in the face of mounting social problems caused by industrialization, urbanization and immigration, liberal Protestants embraced the Social Gospel, which worked for the "regeneration of society" rather than only the conversion of individuals.

The Fundamentalist–Modernist Controversy of the 1920s widened the division between evangelical and non-evangelical Protestants as the two sides fought for control over the mainline denominations. The fundamentalists lost these battles for control to the modernists or liberals. Since the 1920s, mainline churches have been associated with liberal Protestantism.

Episcopalians and Presbyterian WASPs tend to be considerably wealthier and better educated than most other religious groups in America, and are disproportionately represented in the upper reaches of American business, law and politics, and for many years were especially dominant in the Republican Party. Numbers of the wealthiest and most affluent American families, such as the Vanderbilts and Astors, Rockefeller, who were Baptists, Du Pont, Roosevelt, Forbes, Fords, Mellons, Whitneys, the Morgans and Harrimans are Episcopalian and Presbyterian families.

Through the 1940s and 1950s, neo-orthodoxy had become the prevailing theological approach within the mainline churches. This neo-orthodox consensus, however, gave way to resurgent liberal theologies in the 1960s and to liberation theology during the 1970s.

See also
Nicene Creed, sometimes called the "mainstream Christianity"

References

Bibliography

Further reading

 
 
 
 
 
 
 
 
 
 
 Hollinger, David A. Protestants Abroad: How Missionaries Tried to Change the World but Changed America (2017) excerpt
 
 
 
 
 
 

Christian terminology
Protestantism in the United States
1920s neologisms